Khaled Saad Ahmed Matrud (born 9 November 1989 in Benghazi) is a Libyan basketball player. He was part of the Libya national basketball team at the FIBA Africa Championship 2009, where he played for two minutes in one game and did not score.

References

External links

1989 births
Living people
People from Benghazi
Libyan men's basketball players
21st-century Libyan people